The following elections occurred in the year 1988.

Africa
 1988 Cameroonian general election
 1988 Equatorial Guinean legislative election
 1988 Kenyan general election
 1988 Malian parliamentary election
 1988 Rwandan parliamentary election
 1988 Rwandan presidential election
 1988 Senegalese general election
 1988 Zambian general election

Asia
 1988 Afghan parliamentary election
 1988 Bangladeshi general election
 1988 Iranian legislative election
 1988 Israeli legislative election
 1988 Pakistani general election
 1988 Philippine local elections
 1988 Singaporean general election
 1988 South Korean legislative election
 1988 Sri Lankan presidential election
 November 1988 Sri Lankan Provincial Council elections

Australia
 1988 Adelaide by-election
 1988 Barambah state by-election
 1988 Groom by-election
 1988 New South Wales state election
 1988 Oxley by-election
 1988 Port Adelaide by-election
 1988 Australian referendum
 1988 South Coast state by-election
 1988 Victorian state election

Europe
 Catalan parliamentary election, 1988
 1988 Danish parliamentary election
 1988 Faroese parliamentary election
 1988 Finnish presidential election
 1988 French legislative election
 1988 Gibraltar general election
 1988 Icelandic presidential election
 1988 Stockholm municipal election
 1988 Swedish general election

France
 1988 French Matignon Accords referendum
 1988 French cantonal elections
 1988 French presidential election

North America
 1988 Salvadoran legislative election

Canada
 1988 Canadian federal election
 1988 Brantford municipal election
 1988 Hamilton, Ontario municipal election
 1988 Manitoba general election
 1988 Nova Scotia general election
 1988 Ontario municipal elections
 1988 Ottawa municipal election
 1988 Toronto municipal election
 1988 Windsor municipal election

Caribbean
 1988 Haitian presidential election
 1988 Tobago House of Assembly election

Mexico
 1988 Mexican general election

United States
 1988 United States Senate elections
 1988 United States gubernatorial elections
 1988 United States presidential election

United States gubernatorial
 1988 United States gubernatorial elections

California
 United States House of Representatives elections in California, 1988
 United States presidential election in California, 1988

Connecticut
 United States Senate election in Connecticut, 1988

Florida
 United States Senate election in Florida, 1988
 United States presidential election in Florida, 1988

Hawaii
 United States Senate election in Hawaii, 1988

Louisiana
 United States presidential election in Louisiana, 1988

Maryland
 United States Senate election in Maryland, 1988

Massachusetts
 United States Senate election in Massachusetts, 1988

Missouri
 1988 United States Senate election in Missouri
 United States presidential election in Missouri, 1988

Montana
 United States Senate election in Montana, 1988

Nebraska
 United States Senate election in Nebraska, 1988

Nevada
 United States Senate election in Nevada, 1988

New Jersey
 United States Senate election in New Jersey, 1988

New Mexico
 United States Senate election in New Mexico, 1988

North Carolina
 United States presidential election in North Carolina, 1988

North Dakota
 United States Senate election in North Dakota, 1988

Ohio
 United States Senate election in Ohio, 1988

South Carolina
 United States House of Representatives elections in South Carolina, 1988

United States House of Representatives
 1988 United States House of Representatives elections
 United States House of Representatives elections in South Carolina, 1988
 United States House of Representatives elections in California, 1988

United States Senate
 1988 United States Senate elections
 United States Senate election in Connecticut, 1988
 United States Senate election in Florida, 1988
 United States Senate election in Hawaii, 1988
 United States Senate election in Maryland, 1988
 United States Senate election in Massachusetts, 1988
 1988 United States Senate election in Missouri
 United States Senate election in Montana, 1988
 United States Senate election in Nebraska, 1988
 United States Senate election in Nevada, 1988
 United States Senate election in New Jersey, 1988
 United States Senate election in New Mexico, 1988
 United States Senate election in North Dakota, 1988
 United States Senate election in Ohio, 1988
 United States Senate election in Washington, 1988
 United States Senate election in West Virginia, 1988

Washington (U.S. state)
 United States Senate election in Washington, 1988
 1988 Washington gubernatorial election

West Virginia
 United States Senate election in West Virginia, 1988

Oceania

Australia
 1988 Adelaide by-election
 1988 Barambah state by-election
 1988 Groom by-election
 1988 New South Wales state election
 1988 Oxley by-election
 1988 Port Adelaide by-election
 1988 Australian referendum
 1988 South Coast state by-election
 1988 Victorian state election

Hawaii
 United States Senate election in Hawaii, 1988

South America
 1988 Chilean national plebiscite
 1988 Ecuadorian general election
 1988 Venezuelan presidential election

See also

 
1988
Elections